WSBB could refer to:

WSBB (AM), a radio station (1230 AM) licensed to serve New Smyrna Beach, Florida, United States
WSBB-FM, a radio station (95.5 FM) licensed to serve Doraville, Georgia, United States